Oued Essalem (in Arab وادي السلام) is a town and commune in Relizane Province, Algeria. According to the 2008 census, it has a population of 9319. It was previously named Henri Hoc under French colonization. The commune is located in the south-west of its province , it spans over 292.95 km2 and the Manesfa River passes through it, it is the largest commune by area of its district. It is linked by the RN23, and is a stop between the large cities of the west, Tiaret, Oran and Mostaganem, it also possesses a departemental road linking it with the town of Oued El Abtal. Located 100 km away from the Mediterranean Sea, Oued Essalem experiences a warm and dry climate, with a slight alpine tendency, its winters are often rainy, and snowfall can sometimes occur.

References

Communes of Relizane Province
Algeria